The Forsyte Saga is a 1967 BBC television adaptation of John Galsworthy's series of The Forsyte Saga novels, and its sequel trilogy A Modern Comedy. The series follows the fortunes of the upper middle class Forsyte family, and stars Eric Porter as Soames, Kenneth More as Young Jolyon and Nyree Dawn Porter as Irene.

It was adapted for television and produced by Donald Wilson and was originally shown in twenty-six episodes on Saturday evenings between 7 January and 1 July 1967 on BBC2, at a time when only a small proportion of the population had television sets able to receive the channel. It was therefore the Sunday night repeat run on BBC1, starting on 8 September 1968, that secured the programme's success with 18 million tuning in for the final episode in 1969.

It was shown in the United States on public television and broadcast all over the world, and became the first BBC television series to be sold to the Soviet Union.

Production
Donald Wilson initially intended to produce the series as a 15-part serial adapted by Constance Cox in 1959. However, Metro-Goldwyn-Mayer held the rights to the novels, having adapted the first novel A Man of Property into That Forsyte Woman in 1949. After a distribution arrangement with MGM was reached in 1965, the series developed into a groundbreaking 26-part serial, depicting the fortunes of the Forsyte family between 1879 and 1926.

The Forsyte Saga was the last major British drama serial to be made in black and white, even though the BBC was beginning to equip for full-time colour transmission. In an interview included on the DVD release, Wilson admits he would have loved to have shot the programme in colour, but delaying recording would have meant re-casting and he felt he had the perfect cast for the adaptation. The series was a gamble for the BBC, with a budget of £10,000 per episode.

Although never credited, the music that opens and closes each episode is the first movement, "Halcyon Days", from the suite The Three Elizabeths written in the early 1940s by Eric Coates.

Plot

The series was adapted from the three novels and two interludes of John Galsworthy's Forsyte Saga: The Man of Property (1906), Indian Summer of a Forsyte (1918), In Chancery (1920), Awakening (1920) and To Let (1921); and Galsworthy's later trilogy A Modern Comedy.

Cast
The production featured a cast of well-known character actors, of whom the film star Kenneth More was the most famous name.
Terence Alexander as Montague 'Monty' Dartie
John Barcroft as George Forsyte
June Barry as June Forsyte
John Baskcomb as Timothy Forsyte
John Bennett as Philip Bosinney
Jonathan Burn as Val Dartie
Fay Compton as 'Aunt Ann' Forsyte
Karin Fernald as Anne Forsyte née Wilmot
Susan Hampshire as Fleur Mont née Forsyte
Ursula Howells as Frances Forsyte
Martin Jarvis as Jolyon 'Jon' Forsyte
Maggie Jones as Smither
Cyril Luckham as Sir Lawrence Mont
Kenneth More as 'Young Jolyon' Forsyte
Lana Morris as Helene Hillmer
Suzanne Neve as Holly Dartie née Forsyte
Nora Nicholson as Aunt Juley Small
Joseph O'Conor as 'Old Jolyon' Forsyte
Dalia Penn as Annette Forsyte née Lamotte
Nicholas Pennell as Michael Mont
Robin Phillips as Wilfrid Desert
Eric Porter as Soames Forsyte
Nyree Dawn Porter as Irene Forsyte née Heron
Kynaston Reeves as Nicholas Forsyte
Fanny Rowe as Emily Forsyte
Nora Swinburne as 'Aunt Hester' Forsyte
Margaret Tyzack as Winifred Dartie
John Welsh as James Forsyte
Julia White as Coaker
George Woodbridge as Swithin Forsyte
Michael York as Jolyon 'Jolly' Forsyte
Ian Trigger as Greenwater
Ellen Pollock as Madame Lamotte

Broadcast and reception
The series was originally shown over twenty-six episodes on Saturday evenings between 7 January and 1 July 1967 on BBC2, with each episode repeated the following Tuesday evening. This was originally intended to encourage viewers to switch over to BBC2, which had launched in 1964. However, only a small proportion of the viewing public could receive the channel as it was broadcast on the then-new 625-line 
broadcasting system, which required a new TV set to receive, compared to the old 405-line system that BBC1 (and ITV) were broadcast on. It was when the series was later repeated on Sunday evenings on BBC1, starting on 8 September 1968, that the programme's success was secured with 18 million tuning in for the final episode in 1969. It is often quoted that both publicans and clergymen in the United Kingdom complained that the Sunday night repeats were driving away customers and worshippers, respectively, and there are tales of Sunday Evensong services being moved to prevent a clash with the broadcast. A retrospective on the series by when it was screened by the American PBS in the Masterpiece Theatre slot comments:

Viewers remember the way the nation shut down each Sunday night for the event. Pubs closed early and the streets were deserted. The Church even rescheduled its evening worship services so that the immense audience could be ready for the start of the show at 7:25pm.

Following its success in Britain, the series was shown in the United States on public television and broadcast all over the world, and became the first BBC television programme to be sold to the Soviet Union. The worldwide audience was estimated as something in the region of 160 million. The series won a Royal Television Society Silver Medal and a BAFTA for Best Drama Series or Serial. Following its transmission in 1967 by RTÉ, Ireland's public broadcaster, the BBC production won a Jacob's Award at the annual presentation ceremony in Dublin.

The series' success prompted companies to invest in similarly scaled drama serials, which resulted in programmes such as Upstairs, Downstairs and The Pallisers.

Writing after a new adaptation was produced by Granada Television in 2002, Sarah Crompton noted that even Galsworthy's novels paled in comparison to the television series, noting that the adaptation set a lasting precedent for television dramas:
Poor old Galsworthy may in his day have won the Nobel prize for literature, but now he is just a footnote in televisual history – the begetter of the most popular classic serial of all time. This is no exaggeration. One hundred million people in 26 countries ended up seeing Donald Wilson's version of the saga. It was not the first literary adaptation on TV, but it was longer and more ambitious than anything screened before, and it has come to represent every value and standard to which British TV has aspired ever since.

The series has been repeated several times on British television, with one run taking place on BBC1 from 9 January to 1 July 1970 and the final repeat being transmitted on twice-weekly weekday afternoons from 25 September 1974 to 19 December 1974. Episode 13 was repeated on BBC2 on 2 November 1986 as part of a series of programmes shown to mark the fiftieth anniversary of BBC Television. Its success and rebroadcasts has ensured that the full 26 episodes avoided wiping from the archives, and all still exist as their 625-line videotape masters.

In 1992, the series was released in the UK on an 8-volume set of VHS videos, and on Region 2 DVD in 2004.

See also
 The Forsyte Saga (2002 TV series)

References

External links

The Forsyte Saga at the Museum of Broadcast Communications (archived)

BBC television dramas
Period television series
Television shows based on British novels
BAFTA winners (television series)
Jacob's Award winners
1967 British television series debuts
1967 British television series endings
1960s British drama television series
English-language television shows
Television shows set in London
Black-and-white British television shows
Television series set in the 1870s
Television series set in the 1880s
Television series set in the 1890s
Television series set in the 1900s
Television series set in the 1910s
Television series set in the 1920s
The Forsyte Saga